Gustav Gerhart (4 February 1922 – 8 September 1990) was an Austrian footballer. He played in four matches for the Austria national football team between 1945 and 1949.

References

External links

1922 births
1990 deaths
Austrian footballers
Austria international footballers
Place of birth missing
Association football defenders
FC Admira Wacker Mödling players